Victim is a 1999 Hong Kong thriller film directed and co-written by Ringo Lam. The film stars Tony Leung Ka-fai, Lau Ching-wan and Amy Kwok and is about a computer programmer named Ma who is found in a haunted hotel by a cop. The programmer begins to terrify his girlfriend Amy Fu, which leads the cops to think that Ma is covering up some larger crime.

On its release in Hong Kong theatres, the film's ending was changed for 50% of the film prints due to an argument between Ringo Lam and producer Joe Ma. It was nominated for several year-end awards in Asia and was included as a Film of Merit by the 6th Hong Kong Film Critics Society Awards.

Plot

Ma (Lau Ching-wan) is kidnapped in a parking structure. His girlfriend Amy Fu (Amy Kwok) informs the police that though he had been jobless for a while and had a lot of debt, he was not a bad man. Police detective Pit (Tony Leung Ka-fai) later discovers Ma beaten, bloodied, and dangling upside down from the ceiling of an old abandoned hotel. The hotel in question is said to be haunted from murder-suicide of the original owner and his wife. On returning home, Ma starts terrifying Amy by behaving like the famous ghost of the hotel. The police begin to suspect that Ma's possession might be a ruse to hide something other crimes that are happening.

Cast
 Lau Ching-wan as Manson Ma
 Tony Leung Ka-fai as Detective Pit Kwan
 Amy Kwok as Amy Fu
 Wayne Lai as Detective Bee Ting
 Collin Chou as Shing
 Hui Shiu-hung as Detective Yee
 Emily Kwan as Detective Po
 Joe Ma Tak-chung
 Joe Ma Wai-ho
 Joe Lee as Uncle Kwai
 David Lee as Detective David
 Chiu Yun-huen as Mr. Lai
 Chung King-fai as Chairman Lee
 Kong Foo-keung as Detective
 Suki Kwan as Grace Kwan
 Law Wai-kai
 Raymond Tsang as Security Guard Hon
 Wong Wa-wo as Security Guard Wong

Release
Victim was released in Hong Kong on 16 October 1999. Two versions of Victim were released in Hong Kong due to arguments between director Ringo Lam and producer Joe Ma. 50% of the prints released contained an extra shot in the final scene that clarified the question of whether or not the character of Ma was possessed by a ghost. The other 50% reflected the original script, which left this plot element unanswered. The film grossed HK$3,915,929.

Reception
Variety gave a mixed review, stating that the film was at its best with drew "some remarkable playing from its cast" while the ghost story elements were "the weakest". A negative review came from the San Francisco Chronicle, who referred to the film "as ridiculous as it is tepid. Only late in the second half of this almost-two-hour - way too long! - cat-and-mouse game does the film catch fire."

Awards and nominations

See also

 Hong Kong films of 1999
 List of thriller films of the 1990s

Notes

External links
 
 
 Hong Kong Cinemagic entry

1999 films
1990s heist films
1999 action thriller films
Haunted house films
Hong Kong heist films
Hong Kong action thriller films
Police detective films
Films directed by Ringo Lam
Films set in Hong Kong
Films shot in Hong Kong
1990s Hong Kong films